David Musil (born April 9, 1993) is a Canadian born-Czech ice hockey player who is currently playing under contract to HC Oceláři Třinec in the Czech Extraliga (ELH). He was a second round selection of the Edmonton Oilers in the 2011 NHL Entry Draft.  SKA Saint Petersburg picked Musil in the first round, 12th overall of the 2010 KHL Junior Draft.  He played junior hockey in the Western Hockey League for the Vancouver Giants and the Edmonton Oil Kings. Musil was born in Canada, and raised in the Czech Republic.  He represents the Czech Republic in international play.

Playing career
Musil played in the 2005 and 2006 Quebec International Pee-Wee Hockey Tournaments with a youth team from Chomutov.

Musil started his junior ice hockey career in the Western Hockey League (WHL) in a circuitous fashion, as he was initially passed over in the league's bantam draft because he was not living in Canada.  Knowing the family would soon be moving to Vancouver, his father Frank approached the Vancouver Giants about "listing" Musil to obtain his rights.  After this news became public, other teams in the WHL protested, and the league decided to hold a lottery draft specifically to determine Musil's initial destination in the league.  The Kootenay Ice won the draft, and Musil's WHL rights.  They promptly traded him to Vancouver, as Musil had made it clear he wished to play in his new hometown.

During his rookie season in the WHL, Musil played in 71 games with the Giants, scoring 7 goals and adding 25 assists.  Vancouver's director of player personnel, James Ripplinger, praised Musil's play during the season, "His poise with the puck when being pressured, not making any mistakes; he was such a reliable player."

During the 2011 NHL Entry Draft, he got drafted in the second round, 31st overall by the Edmonton Oilers. On June 30, 2012, he signed his entry-level contract (three years) with the Oilers. During the 2014–15 season, the Oilers recalled him and he made his NHL debut on April 4, 2016 against the Calgary Flames. He recorded his first point, an assist in his second game.

On July 29, 2016, he re-signed a one-year, two-way deal with the Oilers.  In the 2016–17 season, Musil amassed 4 goals and 14 points in 47 games with the Bakersfield Condors before he was re-assigned by the Oilers to fellow AHL club, the Tucson Roadrunners in exchange for Mark Olver on March 6, 2017.

As a free agent from the Oilers, Musil opted to return to his native country after 8 seasons abroad, agreeing to a one-year deal with HC Oceláři Třinec of the Extraliga on July 31, 2017.

International play
Despite being born in Canada, Musil represents the Czech Republic in international play.  He has represented his country at the IIHF World Junior Championships twice, in 2012 and 2013.  Earlier in his career, he was a likely pick to play in the 2011 tournament, before he broke his foot blocking a shot in a WHL game.

Personal life
He is the son of former NHL player Frank Musil. His uncle, Bobby Holík, also played in the NHL, and his grandfather, Jaroslav Holík, competed in ice hockey at the 1972 Winter Olympics with the Czechoslovakia national ice hockey team.  His mother, Andrea Holíková, was an accomplished tennis player. His brother, Adam, currently plays for the Red Deer Rebels of the Western Hockey League and was drafted by the St. Louis Blues in the 2015 NHL Entry Draft.

Career statistics

Regular season and playoffs

International

References

External links

1993 births
Living people
Bakersfield Condors (1998–2015) players
Bakersfield Condors players
Czech ice hockey defencemen
Edmonton Oil Kings players
Edmonton Oilers draft picks
Edmonton Oilers players
HC Oceláři Třinec players
Oklahoma City Barons players
Ice hockey people from Calgary
Tucson Roadrunners players
Vancouver Giants players
Czech expatriate ice hockey players in the United States
Canadian expatriate ice hockey players in the United States
Canadian people of Czech descent